Polychrome is the "practice of decorating architectural elements, sculpture, etc., in a variety of colors."  The term is used to refer to certain styles of architecture, pottery or sculpture in multiple colors.

Ancient Egypt

Classical world

Some very early polychrome pottery has been excavated on Minoan Crete such as at the Bronze Age site of Phaistos. In ancient Greece sculptures were painted in strong colors. The paint was frequently limited to parts depicting clothing, hair, and so on, with the skin left in the natural color of the stone. But it could cover sculptures in their totality. The painting of Greek sculpture should not merely be seen as an enhancement of their sculpted form but has the characteristics of a distinct style of art. For example, the pedimental sculptures from the Temple of Aphaia on Aegina have recently been demonstrated to have been painted with bold and elaborate patterns, depicting, amongst other details, patterned clothing. The polychrome of stone statues was paralleled by the use of materials to distinguish skin, clothing and other details in chryselephantine sculptures, and by the use of metals to depict lips, nipples, etc., on high-quality bronzes like the Riace bronzes.

An early example of polychrome decoration was found in the Parthenon atop the Acropolis of Athens. By the time European antiquarianism took off in the 18th century, however, the paint that had been on classical buildings had completely weathered off. Thus, the antiquarians' and architects' first impressions of these ruins were that classical beauty was expressed only through shape and composition, lacking in robust colors, and it was that impression which informed neoclassical architecture. However, some classicists such as Jacques Ignace Hittorff noticed traces of paint on classical architecture and this slowly came to be accepted. Such acceptance was later accelerated by observation of minute color traces by microscopic and other means, enabling less tentative reconstructions than Hittorff and his contemporaries had been able to produce. An example of classical Greek architectural polychrome may be seen in the full size replica of the Parthenon exhibited in Nashville, Tennessee, US.

Medieval world
Throughout medieval Europe religious sculptures in wood and other media were often brightly painted or colored, as were the interiors of church buildings. These were often destroyed or whitewashed during iconoclast phases of the Protestant Reformation or in other unrest such as the French Revolution, though some have survived in museums such as the V&A, Musée de Cluny and Louvre. The exteriors of churches were painted as well, but little has survived. Exposure to the elements and changing tastes and religious approval over time acted against their preservation. The "Majesty Portal" of the Collegiate church of Toro is the most extensive remaining example, due to the construction of a chapel which enclosed and protected it from the elements just a century after it was completed.

Baroque and Rococo periods

While stone and metal sculpture normally remained uncolored, like the classical survivals, polychromed wood sculptures were produced by Spanish artists: Juan Martínez Montañés, Gregorio Fernández (17th century); German: Ignaz Günther, Philipp Jakob Straub (18th century), or Brazilian: Aleijadinho (19th century).

With the arrival of European porcelain in the 18th century, brightly colored pottery figurines with a wide range of colors became very popular.

Monochromatic color solutions of architectural orders were also designed in the late, 
dynamic Baroque, drawing on the ideas of Borromini and Guarini. Single-colored stone 
cladding was used: light sandstone, as in the case of the façade of the Bamberg Jesuit 
church (Gunzelmann 2016) designed by Georg and Leonhard Dientzenhofer (1686–1693), 
the façade of the monastery church in Michelsberg by Leonard Dientzenhofer (1696), and 
the abbey church in Neresheim by J.B. Neumann (1747–1792).

19th century

Polychrome brickwork is a style of architectural brickwork which emerged in the 1860s and used bricks of different colors (typically brown, cream and red) in patterned combination to highlight architectural features. It was often used to replicate the effect of quoining and to decorate around windows. Early examples featured banding, with later examples exhibiting complex diagonal, criss-cross, and step patterns, in some cases even writing using bricks.

20th century
In the twentieth century there were notable periods of polychromy in architecture, from the expressions of Art Nouveau throughout Europe, to the international flourishing of Art Deco or Art Moderne, to the development of postmodernism in the latter decades of the century. During these periods, brickwork, stone, tile, stucco and metal facades were designed with a focus on the use of new colors and patterns, while architects often looked for inspiration to historical examples ranging from Islamic tilework to English Victorian brick. In the 1970s and 1980s, especially, architects working with bold colors included Robert Venturi (Allen Memorial Art Museum addition; Best Company Warehouse), Michael Graves (Snyderman House; Humana Building), and James Stirling (Neue Staatsgalerie; Arthur M. Sackler Museum), among others.

United States

Polychrome building facades later rose in popularity as a way of highlighting certain trim features in Victorian and Queen Anne architecture in the United States. The rise of the modern paint industry following the American Civil War also helped to fuel the (sometimes extravagant) use of multiple colors.

The polychrome facade style faded with the rise of the 20th century's revival movements, which stressed classical colors applied in restrained fashion and, more importantly, with the birth of modernism, which advocated clean, unornamented facades rendered in white stucco or paint. Polychromy reappeared with the flourishing of the preservation movement and its embrace of (what had previously been seen as) the excesses of the Victorian era and in San Francisco, California in the 1970s to describe its abundant late-nineteenth-century houses. These earned the endearment 'Painted Ladies', a term that in modern times is considered kitsch when it is applied to describe all Victorian houses that have been painted with period colors.

John Joseph Earley (1881–1945) developed a "polychrome" process of concrete slab construction and ornamentation that was admired across America. In the Washington, D.C. metropolitan area, his products graced a variety of buildings — all formed by the staff of the Earley Studio in Rosslyn, Virginia. Earley's Polychrome Historic District houses in Silver Spring, Maryland were built in the mid-1930s. The concrete panels were pre-cast with colorful stones and shipped to the lot for on-site assembly. Earley wanted to develop a higher standard of affordable housing after the Depression, but only a handful of the houses were built before he died; written records of his concrete casting techniques were destroyed in a fire. Less well-known, but just as impressive, is the Dr. Fealy Polychrome House that Earley built atop a hill in Southeast Washington, D.C. overlooking the city. His uniquely designed polychrome houses were outstanding among prefabricated houses in the country, appreciated for their Art Deco ornament and superb craftsmanship.

Native American ceramic artists, in particular those in the Southwest, produced polychrome pottery from the time of the Mogollon cultures and Mimbres peoples to contemporary times.

Polychromatic light
The term polychromatic means having several colors. It is used to describe light that exhibits more than one color, which also means that it contains radiation of more than one wavelength. The study of polychromatics is particularly useful in the production of diffraction gratings.

See also
 Encarnación Spanish form of polychrome sculpture
 Gods in Color (exhibition)
 Monochrome (opposite of polychrome)

References

External links

 
 Research in the field of ancient polychrome sculpture In German
 Amiens Cathedral in Colour
 Polychromatic, Reference.com's definition.

Visual arts terminology
Color
Painting techniques